Alpine F1 Team, competing as BWT Alpine F1 Team, is a Formula One constructor which made its debut at the start of the 2021 Formula One World Championship. Formerly named Renault F1 Team and owned by the French automotive company Groupe Renault, the team was rebranded for 2021 to promote Renault's sports car brand, Alpine, and continues to serve as Renault's works team. The chassis and managerial side of the team is based in Enstone, Oxfordshire, England, and the engine side of the team is based in Viry-Châtillon, a suburb of Paris, France. The team competes with a French licence.

Background

Origins of the team

In , following its purchase by Benetton Group, it was renamed and competed as Benetton. Prior to the  season it moved to its current location in Enstone, UK. By the  season, Renault had purchased the team (for the first time), and by the  season its name was changed to Renault F1 Team, and it was racing as Renault. In , Lotus Cars came on board as a sponsor, and the team's name changed to Lotus Renault GP, though still racing as just "Renault" for that season. By 2012, Genii Capital had a majority stake in the team, and from 2012 until 2015 the team's name was Lotus F1 Team, after its branding partner, and it raced as "Lotus". At the end of 2015, Renault had taken over the team for a second time, renaming it to Renault Sport Formula One Team. When discussing the history of the organisation as a whole rather than those of specific constructors it has operated, the colloquialism "Team Enstone" is generally used. The team operates in a  facility on a 17-acre site in Enstone.

Early Alpine Formula One involvement
The involvement of the sportscar manufacturer Automobiles Alpine in Formula One can be traced back to 1968, when the Alpine A350 Grand Prix car was built, powered by a Gordini V8 engine. However, after initial testing with Mauro Bianchi at Zandvoort, the project was ended when it was found that the engine produced around  compared to the Cosworth V8 engines' 400.

In September 2020, Groupe Renault announced their intention to use "Alpine" as their works team's new name going forward to promote the Alpine brand, and thus the team is set to become known as the "Alpine F1 Team" whilst retiring the "Renault F1 Team" moniker after five years.

Racing history

2021 season 
Alpine signed two-time World Champion Fernando Alonso to replace an outgoing Daniel Ricciardo and Esteban Ocon was retained from the 2020 Renault team. The Alpine car uses Renault engines. Renault team boss, Cyril Abiteboul, announced he would leave as Renault transitioned to Alpine. Abiteboul was replaced by Davide Brivio, who previously worked for Suzuki in MotoGP.

Alpine's first race ended with Alonso being forced to retire, after debris caused his car to overheat. Ocon was hit by Aston Martin driver, Sebastian Vettel. Despite a disappointing start, Alpine scored in the next fifteen races, including a victory for Ocon at the 2021 Hungarian Grand Prix. It marked the first victory for a French driver driving a French car powered by a French engine since Alain Prost's triumph at the 1983 Austrian Grand Prix driving a Renault car. Alonso also scored a podium in the Qatar Grand Prix, after qualifying fifth but starting third due to Max Verstappen and Valtteri Bottas gaining grid penalties.

2022 season 
In January 2022, both team principal, Marcin Budkowski, and non-executive director, Alain Prost, left their roles. Otmar Szafnauer, formerly of Aston Martin F1 Team, was announced as the new team principal in the same month. Former deputy secretary-general for sport at the FIA, Bruno Famin, has been recruited as executive director of Alpine at Viry-Châtillon, responsible for power-unit development. Famin had also previously led Peugeot to three consecutive Dakar Rally victories as head of its sporting division from 2016 to 2018, and a Le Mans 24 Hours triumph in 2009 as technical head of its endurance program. Oscar Piastri replaced Daniil Kvyat as test driver. In February 2022, BWT became the title sponsor of the team, in a deal aimed at sustainability drive.

Alonso qualified in second for the Canadian Grand Prix, only behind Verstappen. This was his best finishing position since the 2012 German Grand Prix, though he suffered an issue in the race and finished in ninth.

2023 season 
Alonso is due to move to Aston Martin for the 2023 season. Alpine announced that Piastri would be replacing Alonso;  Piastri immediately denied he had a contract to race with the team. Team principal Szafnauer criticised Piastri, saying that Piastri should show more loyalty to Alpine, and claimed that Piastri was thankful when told about his F1 promotion prior to Alpine's announcement. In September 2022, a hearing of the Contract Recognition Board determined that Alpine did not have a valid contract with Piastri. Piastri is due to drive for McLaren in 2023. During the 2022 Japanese Grand Prix weekend the team confirmed that Pierre Gasly has signed a multiple year contract with them starting 2023.

Complete Formula One results
(key)

Notes
* – Season still in progress.
‡ – Half points awarded as less than 75% of race distance was completed.

References

External links
 Alpine F1 Team's official Website

Alpine F1 Team
Formula One entrants
2021 establishments in France
Auto racing teams established in 2021
Companies based in Oxfordshire
French auto racing teams